David Hogan (born 7 May 1988) is an Irish former professional snooker player currently residing in Borrisokane, County Tipperary. He first entered the professional tour for the 2009–10 season, by winning the 2009 EBSA European Championship but dropped off the same season. He regained a place for the 2011–12 season by finishing top of the Irish rankings. Hogan could only win two matches on his return to the tour. He played in 11 of the 12 minor-ranking Players Tour Championship events throughout the season and following his participation in the last one in December, he did not enter another tournament. He finished the season outside the top 64 who retain their places for the 2012–13 season and therefore dropped off the main tour again. Hogan has not played in a professional event since.

Performance and rankings timeline

References

1988 births
Living people
Irish snooker players
People from Nenagh
People from Borrisokane